Several ships of the Swedish Navy have been named HSwMS Belos, named after the mythological king of Egypt:

  was a submarine rescue ship launched in 1885 and decommissioned in the 1960s
  was a submarine rescue ship launched in 1961 and decommissioned in 1993
  is a submarine rescue ship launched in 1985 and commissioned in 1992

Swedish Navy ship names